Scott Sorry (born Gerard Scott; October 30, 1978 in Philadelphia, Pennsylvania) is an American singer songwriter.  Prior to being a solo artist Scott played with The Wildhearts, Sorry and the Sinatras, Amen and briefly Brides of Destruction.

Biography

Amen (2003–2005)

After playing in a variety of punk bands in Philadelphia, Scott joined US punk rockers Amen on their 2003 Join Or Die tour, playing with the band until late 2005 where he eventually quit the group.

Brides of Destruction (2005)

Following the departure of founder Nikki Sixx, Sorry was announced as the new bassist for hard rock supergroup Brides of Destruction along with The Wildhearts singer, and future bandmate, Ginger who departed the group soon after they began writing new material. They released the album Runaway Brides, produced by Andy Johns, in Europe on September 13 and on September 27 in the US. A video was shot for "White Trash" but both the album and the single failed to chart. Prior to touring, Sorry was replaced by Tracii Guns' stepson Jeremy Guns on bass.

The Wildhearts (2006–2009, 2014)

In 2006, Sorry joined a new Lineup of The Wildhearts recording an album in January 2007, The Wildhearts. The album was released on April 23, preceded two weeks earlier by the download-only single "The Sweetest Song". On May 19, 2008 the Wildhearts released the all-covers album Stop Us If You've Heard This One Before, Vol 1.. Artists covered include Icicle Works, Fugazi, Helmet, The Distillers, The Descendents, and The Georgia Satellites. The first version of the album was a download-only collection of 12 tracks. The band travelled to Denmark to record their ninth studio album, Chutzpah!, which was released on August 31, 2009, followed by a tour of the United Kingdom in September and October. At these shows, the band played the new record in its entirety, followed by an encore of older songs.

The band won the award for Spirit of Independence at the 2009 Kerrang! Awards, as well as playing on the Bohemia stage during the very first UK Sonisphere Festival. On November 25, 2009, The Wildhearts announced the release of 'Chutzpah Jnr', a mini album composed of tracks recorded during the Chutzpah sessions but either released as free tracks on their website, bonus tracks from the Japanese physical release or unreleased tracks from the sessions.

Sorry never joined the Wildhearts for their 2012 reformation due to family commitments. He was replaced by Random Jon Poole, but re-joined the band early in 2014 for their UK tour.

Sorry and the Sinatras (2007–2013)

Sorry initially met Roger "Rags" Segal and Lenny Thomas in North Carolina while Sorry was on tour with previous band Brides of Destruction in 2005 while Roger and Lenny were both in Brides support act Trashlight Vision. Sorry started working on new material with Blackbelt guitarist Danny Sinatra when Trashlight Vision split up. Roger and Lenny then linked up with Sorry and Danny to form the new group, Sorry and the Sinatras. They announced, in June, their first dates in the UK in August, taking place at The Asylum in Birmingham and at the Bar Academy in London. The group entered the studio in September in Barnsley, UK with producer Jason Sanderson.  The album was completed in less than 3 weeks. Highball Roller was released May 11, 2009, which was generally well received by British music critics, with a tour of the UK planned but this was postponed until October with the band touring the East Coast of the US in August.

Solo Career (2015–present)
In February 2015, Scott announced plans to release his very first solo album "When We Were Kings" through a campaign on the Pledgemusic platform.  Achieving 437% of its initial goal  the album was officially released on March 18, 2016 debuting on the Official UK Rock Charts at Number 2. Vive Le Rock Magazine awarded the album 9 out of 10. On October 30, Scott released his first new single in six years. "Black Dog Dancers" was released via Generation X-Ray Records.

Discography

With Brides of Destruction
Runaway Brides (2005)

With The Wildhearts
The Wildhearts (2007)
Stop Us If You've Heard This One Before, Vol 1. (2008)
¡Chutzpah! (2009)
Chutzpah! Jnr. (2009)

With Sorry and the Sinatras
Highball Roller (2009)
Kings of Shambles Street (2012)

Solo Work
When We Were Kings (2016)

References

External links
Official website

Scott Sorry on Facebook

1978 births
Living people
The Wildhearts members
American rock bass guitarists
American male bass guitarists
American punk rock bass guitarists
American rock singers
Singers from Pennsylvania
Guitarists from Philadelphia
Amen (American band) members
Brides of Destruction members
21st-century American male singers
21st-century American singers
21st-century American bass guitarists